The 2020–21 South Carolina Gamecocks women's basketball team represented the University of South Carolina during the 2020–21 NCAA Division I women's basketball season. The Gamecocks, led by thirteenth-year head coach Dawn Staley, played their home games at Colonial Life Arena and competed as members of the Southeastern Conference (SEC). They finished the season 26–5 (14–2 SEC), won the SEC tournament, and won a bid to the NCAA tournament where they advanced to the Final Four and lost to Stanford.

Previous season
The Gamecocks finished the season with a 32–1 overall record and a 16–0 record in conference play. The Gamecocks won the SEC tournament. The Gamecocks therefore received an automatic bid to the 2020 NCAA Division I women's basketball tournament, however the tournament was not held due to the COVID-19 pandemic, and were de facto named mythical national championship by finishing first in the major wire service polls, the AP Poll and Coaches Poll.  On December 31, 2020, during the Florida game, the program raised a banner to recognise the claim.

Offseason

Departures

2020 recruiting class

Preseason

SEC media poll
The SEC media poll was released on November 17, 2020 with the Gamecocks selected to finish in first place in the SEC.

Preseason All-SEC teams
The Gamecocks had two players selected to the preseason all-SEC teams.

First team

Aliyah Boston

Second team

Zia Cooke

Roster

Schedule

|-
!colspan=9 style=| Regular season

|-
!colspan=9 style=| SEC Tournament

|-
!colspan=9 style=| NCAA tournament

See also
2020–21 South Carolina Gamecocks men's basketball team

References

South Carolina Gamecocks women's basketball seasons
South Carolina
South Carolina Gamecocks w
South Carolina Gamecocks w
South Carolina
NCAA Division I women's basketball tournament Final Four seasons